Sergio Villanueva Fernández (born 2 November 1975) is a Spanish professional footballer who plays for CD Tuilla as a midfielder.

Football career
Born in Mieres, Asturias, Villanueva graduated from Caudal Deportivo's youth setup, and made his senior debut while on loan at amateurs Santiago de Aller CF in 1994. In 1996 he signed for Sporting de Gijón, being assigned to the reserves in Segunda División B but eventually returning to his first club in the following year, in a season-long loan deal.

Villanueva moved to another reserve team in the summer of 1998, Deportivo Alavés B from Tercera División. In January of the following year he joined SD Noja in the third level, and subsequently represented Club Marino de Luanco, playing in both the third and fourth tiers.

In July 2002, Villanueva signed with Segunda División's SD Eibar. His first match as a professional took place on 1 September, aged 27, playing the last two minutes in a 0–0 away home draw against Polideportivo Ejido. After featuring rarely, however, he moved to Zamora CF in January of the following year.

Villanueva joined third division side UD Vecindario in the 2005 off-season, appearing regularly in his first season, which ended in promotion. He was played sparingly in his second, and terminated his contract on 22 January 2007, subsequently signing for Real Oviedo.

Villanueva moved back to former club Marino de Luanco in 2010, being promoted to the third level at the first attempt. In August 2012, he joined CD Lealtad also in his native region and division four.

References

External links
 
 
 
 

1975 births
Living people
Footballers from Mieres, Asturias
Spanish footballers
Association football midfielders
Segunda División players
Segunda División B players
Tercera División players
Caudal Deportivo footballers
Sporting de Gijón B players
Deportivo Alavés B players
Marino de Luanco footballers
SD Eibar footballers
Zamora CF footballers
UD Vecindario players
Real Oviedo players
CD Lealtad players